Plantak is a Croatian surname.

It is among the most common surnames in Varaždin County of Croatia.

It may refer to:
 Karlo Plantak (born 1997), Croatian football player

References

Croatian surnames